Bhutan participated in the 15th Asian Games, officially known as the XV Asiad held in Doha from December 1 to December 15, 2006. The athletes represented Bhutan in archery, taekwondo, and tennis in this edition of the Asiad.

Archery

Bhutan sent the following archers to the 2006 Asian Games:
Men
 Rinchen Gyeltshen
 Tashi Peljor
 Chencho Dorji
 Tashi Dorji
Women
 Dorji Dolma
 Dorji Dema
 Tshering Chhoden
 Tenzin Lhamo

Taekwondo

Bhutan sent the following athletes:
Men
 Tandin Dendup 54 kg
 Kinley Rabgay 58 kg
 Tashi Tashi 67 kg
 Tashi Dukpa 72 kg
 Sonam Penjor 78 kg
 Phub Thinley 84 kg
Women
 Sonam Gaki 51 kg
 Sangay Wangmo 63 kg

Tennis

Bhutan sent the following athletes:
 Deepesh Chhetri
 Kinley Wangchuk

References

Nations at the 2006 Asian Games
2006
Asian Games